is a Japanese dark fantasy manga series written and illustrated by You Higuri. Set during the Italian Renaissance, it follows the life of Cesare Borgia, whose soul is damned in a pact made with the Devil. The manga was serialized in Akita Shoten's Princess Gold magazine from 2000 to 2010, with its chapters collected into 12 bound volumes. It was licensed for an English-language release in North America by Go! Comi, who published 10 volumes before going out of business in 2010.

Synopsis
In the manga, Cesare's father Rodrigo Borgia, a Cardinal, sells his infant son's soul to the Devil as part of a deal that will one day make him Pope Alexander VI. Cesare is consequently shunned by his father, who is unable to see him as anything but an agent of darkness and reminder of his sin. Increasingly alienated, Cesare eventually comes to rely on the dark powers within himself. He becomes obsessed with  the idea of conquest and is aided in his political machinations by the assassin Don Michelotto.

Publication
Cantarella was written and illustrated by You Higuri. It was serialized in Akita Shoten's  (girls') manga magazine Princess Gold, starting in 2000. It went on hiatus for four years and two weeks in June 2005, resuming serialization in Princess Golds September 2009 issue on August 17, 2009. The manga concluded in 2010. Akita Shoten collected the individual chapters into 12  (bound volumes) published under the Princess Comics imprint from March 8, 2001, to June 16, 2010.

Go! Comi licensed the manga for an English-language release in North America; they published 10 volumes before going out of business in 2010. Cantarella has also been translated into Traditional Chinese by Ever Glory Publishing, French by Asuka, German by Carlsen Comics, Russian by Palma Press, and Italian by Free Books.

Volume list

Reception
In 2007, Cantarella was listed as one of the Young Adult Library Services Association's Great Graphic Novels for Teens.

See also
 Cesare – another manga series about Cesare Borgia's early life

References

Further reading

External links
 Cantarella at Go! Comi (defunct; link via the Wayback Machine)
 

2000 manga
Akita Shoten manga
Comics based on real people
Comics set in Italy
Comics set in the 15th century
Comics set in the 16th century
Cultural depictions of Cesare Borgia
Cultural depictions of Pope Alexander VI
Dark fantasy anime and manga
Go! Comi titles
Historical fantasy anime and manga
Shōjo manga
You Higuri